Brad Tschida (born ) is an American politician. He has served as a Republican member for the 97th district in the Montana House of Representatives since 2015. In 2018, he was elected House Majority Leader. In April 2021, Tschida announced he was running for State Senate in Senate district 49.

References

1954 births
2020 United States presidential electors
20th-century American businesspeople
21st-century American businesspeople
21st-century American politicians
Businesspeople from Montana
Living people
Republican Party members of the Montana House of Representatives
People from Missoula, Montana
University of Montana alumni